Vincent Jones is a Canadian keyboardist and music producer. He was a member of The Grapes of Wrath and Ginger, and a frequent collaborator with Lava Hay, a band which included Jones' former wife, Michele Gould.

Early life
Jones was born to parents Leslie and Patricia Jones (née Smith), originally from Corby, England. The family moved to Canada after Leslie was offered a job in the country. He also has two sisters, Clare and Michelle.

Career
Jones joined The Grapes of Wrath in 1990, and played keyboard with the band for some time.  When Kevin Kane left the band, the remaining members, Jones, Tom Hooper and Chris Hooper, continued to perform under the name Ginger.

Following Ginger's breakup, Jones became a session and musician and producer. He performed on studio albums by Mystery Machine, Cowboy Junkies, Monster Magnet, Rose Chronicles and Bruce McCulloch.

Jones backed David Gahan during his 2003 North American tour in support of the album Paper Monsters, and performed on Gahan's live video project Live Monsters. In 2009 he produced Tom Anselmi's multimedia project Mirror.

Jones co-wrote the theme song to NBC's Parks and Recreation with Gaby Moreno, which was nominated for an Emmy in the category of "Outstanding Main Title Theme Music" in July 2010.

In 2014 Jones performed with Sarah McLachlan and appeared on her album Shine On.

In 2021, Jones played  piano, keyboards and strings on Jerry Cantrell's album Brighten.

References 

Year of birth missing (living people)
Living people
Canadian rock keyboardists
Canadian session musicians
Canadian folk rock musicians
Musicians from British Columbia